Foster Creek is a stream in Cape Girardeau County in the U.S. state of Missouri. It is a tributary of Hubble Creek.

The confluence is two miles south of Gordonville and 2.5 miles northwest of Dutchtown.

Foster Creek was named after Jacob Foster, a pioneer settler.

See also
List of rivers of Missouri

References

Rivers of Cape Girardeau County, Missouri
Rivers of Missouri